Raj na Zemlji postoji is the first album by the Serbian noise-rock band Klopka Za Pionira, released in 2004 (see 2004 in music) on the Ne-ton independent label. The album is characterized by fast tempo punk-like songs with only clues to the band's future sound.


Track listing
All music by Klopka Za Pionira
"Šuma šuma" – 3:48
"Matematika (osnovno obrazovanje)" – 3:01
"Matematika (srednje obrazovanje)" – 3:42
"Matematika (visoko obrazovanje)" – 0:51
"Ne, gospodine" – 3:03
"Da li hoćeš da ti pevam" – 1:21
"Polomi mu kosti, sačuvaj moral" – 1:21
"Šta će novo kada ima staro" – 2:11
"Mesija" – 3:48
"Vozite bezbrižno" – 2:57
"Sveštenik" – 2:32
"Snaga je u našoj mladoj generaciji" – 9:47

Personnel
Mileta Mijatović - samples
Damjan Brkić - samples, programming
Vladimir Lenhart - bass guitar

References

External links 
 Free streaming of all songs on the official website

Klopka Za Pionira albums
2004 albums